Mallyan Spout is a waterfall in North Yorkshire, England, the tallest waterfall in the North York Moors.

Geography
The waterfall is located in the village of Goathland and has a vertical drop of 70 feet.

References

External links 
 Goathland, Mallyan Spout and Beck Hole

Waterfalls of North Yorkshire
Landforms of North Yorkshire